The Mount Wilson Formation is a stratigraphic unit of Late Ordovician age. It is present on the western edge of the Western Canada Sedimentary Basin in the Rocky Mountains of Alberta and British Columbia. It consists of quartz sandstone, and was named for the Mount Wilson in Banff National Park by C.D. Walcott in 1923.

Lithology and thickness
The Mount Wilson Formation consists of light grey to white, thin- to thick-bedded quartz sandstone that is well-cemented by clear quartz. It reaches a thickness of about 450 m (1476 feet) south of Golden, British Columbia.

Distribution and relationship to other units
The Mount Wilson Formation is present in the Rocky Mountains of Alberta and British Columbia. It rests conformably on the Owen Creek Formation in the eastern main ranges and on the Glenogle Formation in the western main ranges, and is overlain by the Beaverfoot Formation.

References

Western Canadian Sedimentary Basin
Geologic formations of Canada
Geologic formations of Alberta
Stratigraphy of Alberta
Stratigraphy of British Columbia